The 2013 term of the Supreme Court of the United States began October 7, 2013, and concluded October 5, 2014. The table illustrates which opinion was filed by each justice in each case and which justices joined each opinion.

Table key

2013 term opinions

2013 term membership and statistics
This was the ninth term of Chief Justice Roberts's tenure and the fourth term with the same membership.

Notes

References

Further reading
 

Lists of United States Supreme Court opinions by term